The Phoenix and Eastern Railroad was a railroad company in the state of Arizona. The company would be leased by the Arizona Eastern Railroad, a subsidiary of the Southern Pacific, in 1910. A portion of its original line remains in service and is operated by the Copper Basin Railway.

History 
The Phoenix and Eastern was incorporated on August 31, 1901 and among its founders were Baron Gaston de Fontenilliat, William George Tiffany, George S. Pitcairn, M. H. Twomey and J. H. Martin. At Benson it would interchange with the Southern Pacific and also the El Paso and Southwestern Railroad. The company had the backing of the Atchison, Topeka and Santa Fe Railway, which was seeking to expand its operations in southern Arizona. The Southern Pacific responded by backing a rival company, the Arizona Eastern, which also intended to build along the Gila River. In 1903–1904 a minor railroad war broke out as the two companies struggled over control of the route. The ATSF and the SP eventually reached a compromise: in exchange for the SP taking control of the Phoenix and Eastern, SP made concessions to the ATSF in Northern California.

The Arizona Eastern formally leased the Phoenix and Eastern on March 1, 1910, ending that company's independent existence.

See also
Southern Pacific Transportation Company

References 

Defunct Arizona railroads
Railway companies established in 1901
Railway companies disestablished in 1910
1901 establishments in Arizona Territory
Predecessors of the Southern Pacific Transportation Company